Joar Nils Arvid Karlsson Forssell (born 17 February 1993) is a Swedish politician and a member of the Swedish parliament. Between 6 August 2016 and 18 August 2019 he was chairperson of LUF, Liberal Youth of Sweden. In the 2018 parliamentary elections he got a place in the parliament for the Liberals. He is one of the 20 members of parliament that belong to the Liberals. He is a member of the Taxation Committee since 2018.

Drug liberalization
Joar is a Swedish cannabis rights activist, and has expressed his opinion against the zero tolerance drug policy of Sweden. He is also a supporter of abolishing the monarchy and was the recipient of an award from the Swedish Republican Association.

References 

1993 births
Living people
Swedish cannabis activists
Swedish political people
Members of the Riksdag 2018–2022
Members of the Riksdag from the Liberals (Sweden)
Members of the Riksdag 2022–2026